Jefferson Barracks National Cemetery is an American military cemetery located in St. Louis County, Missouri, just on the banks of the Mississippi River. The cemetery was established after the American Civil War in an attempt to put together a formal network of military cemeteries. It started as the Jefferson Barracks Military Post Cemetery in 1826 and became a United States National Cemetery in 1866.

The first known burial was Elizabeth Ann Lash, the infant child of an officer stationed at Jefferson Barracks.

The cemetery is administered by the Department of Veterans Affairs on the former site of Jefferson Barracks. The cemetery is listed in the National Register of Historic Places.

Notable interments

Medal of Honor recipients
 Major Ralph Cheli (1919–1944), for heroism while leading a bombing mission in World War II
 George Hobday (1839–1891), for action at the Wounded Knee Massacre, 1890
 Lorenzo D. Immell (1837–1912), for action at the Battle of Wilson's Creek, 1890 
 Donald D. Pucket (1915–1944), pilot in the U.S. Army Air Forces, for action in World War II
 David Ryan (1836–1896), for action during the Indian Wars in 1877
 Martin Schubert (1838–1912), for action during the American Civil War in 1862 
 Bruce Avery Van Voorhis (1908–1943), US Navy pilot, for action in the Pacific

Other notable individuals
 Michael Blassie (1948–1972), previously interred as the "Vietnam unknown soldier" at the Tomb of the Unknowns from 1984 to 1998, re-interred here in 1998 after DNA testing positively identified his remains
 Jack Buck (1924–2002), former St. Louis Cardinals baseball announcer
 Franklin Gritts (1915–1996), Cherokee artist and art director of the Sporting News
 Johnnie Johnson (1924–2005), pioneering rock musician
 Walter Mayberry (1915–1944), college football player who died in a Japanese POW camp
 Robert McFerrin Sr. (1921–2006), opera singer
 Hughie Miller (1886–1945), baseball player who earned the Distinguished Service Cross and Purple Heart in World War I 
 Henry Townsend (1909–2006), musician
 Three veterans of the American Revolution buried in the Old Post Section:
 Private Richard Gentry, veteran of the Revolutionary and the Indian Wars. He was present at the surrender of Cornwallis at Yorktown.
 Major Russell Bissell (1756–1807), veteran of the Revolutionary and Indian Wars.
 Colonel Thomas Hunt (1754–1808), a "Minuteman" at the Battle of Concord, April 1775. During the revolution he was wounded at the Battle of Stony Point and Siege of Yorktown. He was also a veteran of the Indian Wars and commanded the 1st Infantry Regiment.
 Other burials of note
 Mass grave for 123 of the 139 victims of the Palawan Massacre
 Remains of 5 crewmen from B-36 Bomber 075 lost on the coast of British Columbia, Canada while conducting a training mission on February 13, 1950

Memorial to the Confederate Dead 
A monument entitled Memorial to the Confederate Dead was placed in Jefferson Barracks on May 1, 1988 It is located in section 66 of the cemetery. Not to be confused with the removed Memorial to the Confederate Dead (St. Louis).

It was placed by the Jefferson Barracks Civil War Historical Association, Sons of Confederate Veterans, and the Missouri Society Military Order of the Stars and Bars.
The front of the monument features three Confederate flags: the first national flag (seven-star variant of the "Stars and Bars"), the Confederate Battle Flag, and the last national flag ("Blood-Stained Banner").

Under the flags is a quote by Berry Benson

References

External links

 Jefferson Barracks National Cemetery
 St. Louis County: Jefferson Barracks
 
 
 
 

Victorian architecture in Missouri
1866 establishments in Missouri
Buildings and structures in St. Louis County, Missouri
Cemeteries on the National Register of Historic Places in Missouri
Historic American Buildings Survey in Missouri
Historic American Landscapes Survey in Missouri
Protected areas of St. Louis County, Missouri
National Register of Historic Places in St. Louis County, Missouri
United States national cemeteries